Taco Ockerse (born 21 July 1955), known mononymously as Taco, is an Indonesian-Dutch singer and entertainer who started his career in Germany.

Early life 
Taco Ockerse was born in Jakarta, Indonesia, on 21 July 1955, he spent many of his childhood years moving around the world, residing in the Netherlands, the United States, Singapore, Luxembourg, Belgium, and Germany. He attended the International School of Brussels, Belgium, and graduated in 1973. Afterwards, he studied interior decoration and finished acting school in Hamburg. He held lead roles in numerous school productions, including You're a Good Man, Charlie Brown; Carousel; The Fantasticks; and Fiddler on the Roof.
In 1975, he began his first professional theatrical engagements in Hamburg. This included roles in Children's Theatre, and roles as an ensemble member of the Thalia Theatre in a number of plays, including Sweet Charity, Chicago, and Three Musketeers. He also directed and choreographed for the musical Nightchild. In 1979, he played "Chino" in John Neumeier's West Side Story at Hamburg Opera House. He founded his first band, Taco's Bizz, in 1979.

Career
In 1981, Taco signed his first record contract with Polydor in West Germany for two record releases, whereon he released his first single, "Puttin' On the Ritz", which in 1982 was issued by RCA Records for US release. His version of the song also had pieces of other Irving Berlin songs, such as "White Christmas". The single was widely played throughout the US by late summer of 1983, eventually peaking at No. 4 in September 1983 on the Hot 100 as well as No. 1 on Cashbox. Although the single eventually earned him a Gold-certification for selling over one million copies, it was Taco's only Top 40 hit in the US. In 1983 and 1984, he toured extensively throughout Europe. While the single "Puttin' on the Ritz" topped the charts in Sweden and New Zealand, it entered the Top 5 in numerous countries including Norway, Austria, and Canada. His subsequent album, After Eight, was released in over 40 countries and managed to reach No. 4 in Norway, No. 5 in Canada, No. 11 in Austria, No. 17 in New Zealand, No. 23 in the United States, and No. 59 in Germany.  The album earned Taco a number of Gold certifications including one in Finland for selling over 25,000 copies.

Taco's second single "Singing in the Rain" was a moderate success peaking at No. 49 in Germany, No. 46 in Canada, and No. 98 in the UK.

He appeared as a guest on The Merv Griffin Show, Alan Thicke, Solid Gold, Good Morning America, a Bob Hope TV special, and many other TV shows while touring.

Taco's follow-up album, Let's Face the Music, was recorded in 1984 for Polydor, which peaked at No. 58 in his home of West Germany and managed to enter the Top 100 in Canada peaking at No. 92. Taco continued to record, focusing mostly on the German market with albums Swing Classics/In the Mood of Glenn Miller in 1985 and Tell Me That You Like It in 1986 for Polydor. In 1987 he recorded the self-titled album Taco.

In 1989, he briefly flirted with contemporary dance music by releasing a pair of singles, "Love Touch" and "Got to Be Your Lover", that were styled after the high energy disco sound popularized by Stock Aitken Waterman. Afterwards, he repositioned himself as a swing/soul singer. He has collaborated with Geff Harrison of Kin Ping Meh fame.

Between 1989 and 1996, Taco worked as an actor. He had television acting roles in Friedrichstadt Palast and Das Erbe der Guldenburgs, and an appearance in the film . He also appeared as "Chico" in the theater production of Marx Brothers Radio Show, and played lead roles in Shakespeare Rock n Roll in Berlin and Shakespeare as We Like It in Austria.

He currently resides in Germany, performing with his band and as a gala artist.

On 11 October 2009, the first channel of Russian TV, 1TV, filmed the program Songs of the 20th Century. Taco appears with "Puttin' On the Ritz" in the sequence about the 1930s. The show was broadcast in January 2010.  On 27 November 2009 he performed "Puttin' On the Ritz" and "Singin' in the Rain" at the Olympic Stadium in Moscow, Russia. Furthermore, he was the star guest in the "New Year's Eve Show 2009" of Russian TV, which had about 84 million viewers in more than 20 countries.

In July 2010, Cleopatra Records Los Angeles released an entirely new re-recording of "Puttin' On the Ritz". Taco's vocals were recorded in Germany and the backing tracks with top studio musicians in their studio in L.A.

On 1 March 2011, DingDing Music released the original song "Timeless Love" that was written and produced by Edgar Rothermich and Matthias Muentefering in the late 1980s. The studio recording that Taco performed as a duet with the singer Rozaa Wortham in Berlin was remixed in late 2010 in the U.S. and is now available for download.

On 11 March 2011, RTL Germany broadcast The Ultimate Chartshow - the most successful Evergreens of all time, where he appeared with "Puttin' On The Ritz".

Discography

Albums

Studio albums

Compilation albums

EPs

Singles

References

External links
 
Official YouTube Channel
Discography at Discogs

Official "Timeless Love" Release Site

1955 births
Living people
Dutch male singers
Dutch new wave musicians
Indonesian emigrants to the Netherlands
Musicians from Hamburg
Polydor Records artists
RCA Records artists
Singers from Jakarta